Mikhail Osipovich Gershenzon (Kishinev,  -  Moscow, 19 February 1925) was a Russian scholar, essayist and editor. He studied history, philosophy, and political science at Moscow University, graduating in 1894. From graduation until the Bolshevik revolution he was unable to obtain an official academic position because he was Jewish. He was a literary reviewer for Nauchnoe Slovo (Scientific word) from 1903 to 1905 and for Vestnik Evropy (Herald of Europe) in 1907–08, and was literary editor of Kriticheskoe Obozrenie (Critical review), 1907–09. He had a common-law relationship with Maria Goldenveizer from 1904 (Jews and Orthodox Christians were unable to marry legally); they had a daughter and a son. In 1909 he edited the famous essay collection Vekhi, for which he wrote the introduction and an essay.

During the Civil War he worked in various sections of the People's Commissariat for Education (Narkompros). He was first chair of the Moscow Writers' Union in 1918 and of the All-Russian Writers' Union in 1920–21, during which years he was also a member of the leadership of Narkompros; he was head of the literary section, Moscow Academy of Artistic Sciences from 1922 to 1925.

Selected publications
 “The Destinies of the Jewish People”. Telos 58 (Winter 1983-84). New York: Telos Press.

References
 Berman, Iakov, Gershenzon, Bibliografiia, Odessa, Odespoligraf, 1928.
 Brian Horowitz, The Myth of A.S. Pushkin in Russia's Silver Age: M. O. Gershenzon-Pushinist.  Northwestern University Press, 1997. (Republished in Russian translation: Mikhail Gershenzon Pushkinist: Pushkinskii mif v serebrianom veke russkoi literatury, Moscow: Minuvshee, 2004.)
 “M. O. Gershenzon, Alexander Pushkin, the Bible and the Flaws of Jewish Nationalism,” Znanie. Ponimanie. Umenie [Knowledge. Understanding. Skill], 4, 2016.
 “M. O. Gershenzon and George Florovsky ('Metaphysical Philosophers of Russian History'),” Canadian-American Slavonic Studies, 34, no. 3, 2001, 365–374.
 “Unity and Disunity in Landmarks: The Rivalry between Petr Struve and Mikhail Gershenzon,” Studies in East European Thought, 51, no. 1, March 1999, 61–78.
 “From the Annals of the Literary Life of Russia's Silver Age: The Tempestuous Relationship of S. A. Vengerov and M. O. Gershenzon,” Wiener Slawistischer Almanach 35, 1995, 77–95; abridged form in “Oh Rus!” Festschrift to Honor Professor Hugh McLean, eds. S. Karlinsky, J. Rice and B. Scheer, Berkeley: Berkeley Slavic Specialties, 1995, 406-419.
 “The End of a Friendship: the Russian-Jewish Rift in Twentieth-Century Russian Philosophy: N. A. Berdiaev and M. O. Gershenzon,” Russian Review 53: 4, October 1994, 497-514. Republished: Twentieth-Century Literary Criticism, ed. Scot Peacock, New York: Gale 67, 1997, 75-83. “Ot Vekh' k russkoi revoliutsii: dva filosofa N. A. Berdiaev i M. O. Gershenzon.”Vestnik russkogo studencheskogo khristianskogo dvizheniia 166, May, 1992, 89-132.
 “M. O. Gershenzon and the Perception of a Leader in Russia's Silver-Age Culture,” Wiener Slawistischer Almanach  29, 1992, 45-73.
 “Before the Fall” (On Vekhi [Landmarks]), The American Scholar, Spring, 1992, 290-296.
 Memoirs of Gershenzon’s daughter. “Les premiers pas dans la vie: les années de mon immortalité,” La revue des études slaves 63, 1991, 621–629.

External links
 

1869 births
1925 deaths
Moscow State University alumni
Russian political scientists
Jewish Russian writers
Imperial Moscow University alumni
Vekhovtsy